Woodside was the original terminus station on the Woodside railway line, and opened in June 1923.

References

Disused railway stations in Victoria (Australia)
Transport in Gippsland (region)
Shire of Wellington